Natica larvaroni is a species of predatory sea snail, a marine gastropod mollusk in the family Naticidae, the moon snails.

Description
The length of the shell attains 22.5 mm.

Distribution
This marine species occurs off Gabon.

References

 Bernard P.A. (1984). Coquillages du Gabon [Shells of Gabon]. Pierre A. Bernard: Libreville, Gabon. 140 pp, 75 plates, illus.
 Torigoe K. & Inaba A. (2011). Revision on the classification of Recent Naticidae. Bulletin of the Nishinomiya Shell Museum. 7: 133 + 15 pp., 4 pls.

Naticidae
Gastropods described in 1983